Ángel Schandlein (died 4 April 1998) was an Argentine footballer. He played in nine matches for the Argentina national football team in 1956 and 1957. He was also part of Argentina's squad for the 1957 South American Championship.

References

External links
 

Year of birth missing
1998 deaths
Argentine footballers
Argentina international footballers
Place of birth missing
Association football defenders
Club de Gimnasia y Esgrima La Plata footballers
Boca Juniors footballers
Club América footballers
Deportivo Toluca F.C. players
Argentine expatriate footballers
Expatriate footballers in Mexico